Death in Little Tokyo is a 1996 book written by Dale Furutani and published by St. Martin's Press on 1 October 1996 which later went on to win the Anthony Award for Best First Novel and the Macavity Award for Best First Mystery Novel in 1997.

References 

Anthony Award-winning works
American mystery novels
1996 American novels